Cherokee County Airport may refer to:

 Cherokee County Regional Airport in Cherokee County, Georgia, United States (FAA: CNI, formerly 47A)
 Cherokee County Airport (Texas) in Cherokee County, Texas, United States (FAA: JSO)
 Centre–Piedmont–Cherokee County Regional Airport in Alabama (FAA: PYP)
 Western Carolina Regional Airport, owned by Cherokee county in North Carolina (FAA: RHP)